Mont Joly (2,525 m) is a mountain in the Beaufortain Massif in Haute-Savoie, France.

Mountains of Haute-Savoie
Mountains of the Alps
Two-thousanders of France